The Rivière Pilote or Grande Rivière Pilote is a river of Martinique. It passes through the town Rivière-Pilote and flows into the Caribbean Sea near Sainte-Luce.

See also
List of rivers of Martinique

References

Rivers of Martinique
Rivers of France